Enteromius lujae is an African species of freshwater fish. It lives in the Sankuru River of D. R. Congo and Luce River, Kukulakaze, Cuanza River, Kunene River and Okavango River of Angola. It is hunted for human consumption and is threatened by artisanal and intensive diamond mining which causes sedimentation in small rivers of Kasai River.

Footnotes

Barbus lujae IUCN Red List (Accessed 2014)

Enteromius
Taxa named by George Albert Boulenger
Fish described in 1913